The Buckeye Vista Overlook is a historic scenic overlook in Ouachita National Forest. It is located on Ouachita National Forest Road 38 (also  Polk County Road 64) on the north side of Buckeye Mountain. The wall was built out of quarried stone and mortar in 1935 by a crew of the Civilian Conservation Corps (CCC). It is one of only two CCC-built overlooks in the national forest.

The site was listed on the National Register of Historic Places in 2007.

See also
National Register of Historic Places listings in Polk County, Arkansas

References

Roads on the National Register of Historic Places in Arkansas
Buildings and structures in Polk County, Arkansas
Ouachita National Forest
National Register of Historic Places in Polk County, Arkansas
1935 establishments in Arkansas